Ficus pumila var. awkeotsang is a member of the fig family and a variety of Ficus pumila. The plant is sometimes grown near betel nut palms thus providing a tall trunk, which the fig uses as a support to climb.

Use

The main use of this plant is its fruit seed, which is harvested to make aiyu jelly in Taiwan (known as ice jelly in Singapore).  The jelly, when combined with sweeteners and lemon or lime juice is a favorite snack in Taiwanese night markets, Taiwanese farmers' markets and Singapore hawker centres.

See also
O-aew

References

pumila var. awkeotsang
Endemic flora of Taiwan